The following lists events that happened during 1940 in South Africa.

Incumbents
 Monarch: King George VI.
 Governor-General : Sir Patrick Duncan
 Prime Minister: Jan Christiaan Smuts.
 Chief Justice: James Stratford.

Events
January
 27 – A peace resolution introduced in the Parliament of South Africa is defeated 81–59.
 29 – The Herenigde Nasionale Party is established.

June
 11 – The Union of South Africa declares war on Italy.

December
 3 – The Royal Navy battle cruiser HMS Renown and aircraft carrier HMS Ark Royal arrive at Cape Town.

Births

 19 January – Barend du Plessis, government minister
 31 January – Kitch Christie, Springbok rugby coach. (d. 1998)
 9 February – J. M. Coetzee, writer and 2003 Nobel Prize laureate.
 18 February – Prue Leith, restauranteur and broadcaster.
 22 February – Johnson Mlambo, Pan Africanist Congress politician.
 8 March – Fred Brownell, herald, designer of the Flag of South Africa.
 6 June – Tiger Lance, cricketer. (d. 2010)
 9 October – Manto Tshabalala-Msimang, politician. (d. 2009)
 21 October – Manfred Mann, South African-British rock musician.

Deaths
 1 June – Jan F. E. Celliers, poet, writer and dramatist. (b. 1865)
 10 August – Abe Bailey, diamond tycoon, politician, financier and cricketer. (b. 1864)

Railways

Railway lines opened
 12 January – Transvaal: Crown to Langlaagte, .
 2 December – Transvaal: Germiston to Jupiter, .

Sports

References

Sources
 

History of South Africa
 
South Africa
South Africa
1940s in South Africa
Years of the 20th century in South Africa